Evans & Dixon, L.L.C. is a defense firm engaging in the practice of workers' compensation, labor and employment law, civil liability defense, healthcare, collections, intellectual property, and various business law areas. Founded in 1945, Evans & Dixon is headquartered in St. Louis with offices in Kansas City MO, Springfield MO, Columbia MO, Overland Park  KS, Omaha NE, and Chicago IL.

Overview 

Evans & Dixon, L.L.C. offers legal coverage in the areas of labor and employment law, workers' compensation defense, healthcare, insurance defense, collections, corporate law, M&A, intellectual property law and property subrogation among numerous other areas. In March 2009, the firm merged with Amelung, Wulff, Willenbrock & Pankowski, P.C., bringing its total attorney count to 75. Evans & Dixon has six offices and serves the states of Missouri, Illinois, Kansas, Nebraska and Iowa. Evans & Dixon is managed by member, Timothy Tierney and an executive member board. Greg Godfrey serves as the law firm’s chief financial officer. Today the firm has a total of 90 attorneys.

Practice Groups 
Civil Litigation – Appellate Resources and Business Litigation; Collections; Labor and Employment Law Practice; Subrogation; Workers’ Compensation and Employers’ Liability – Workers’ Compensation Subrogation; Business Law - Mergers & Acquisitions, Real Estate Law, Environmental Law, Trusts & Estates; Intellectual Property.

References

External links 

Law firms based in St. Louis
Law firms established in 1945
1945 establishments in Missouri